Bacon–Harding Farm is a historic home and farm located at Gaines in Orleans County, New York. It is a 200-year-old farm still owned by the same family.  The farm is centered on a Greek Revival style cobblestone farmhouse built in 1844.

It was listed on the National Register of Historic Places in 2013.

References

Farms on the National Register of Historic Places in New York (state)
Houses completed in 1844
Cobblestone architecture in New York (state)
Greek Revival houses in New York (state)
Buildings and structures in Orleans County, New York
National Register of Historic Places in Orleans County, New York